The Town of Kyabram was a local government area in the Goulburn Valley region,  west of Shepparton and about  north of Melbourne, the state capital of Victoria, Australia.

History

The town was originally on the western edge of the Shire of Rodney, but on 1 April 1954, it was severed and became a borough. On 4 July 1973, Kyabram became a town. The town annexed  of land from the Shire of Rodney on 1 October 1991.

On 18 November 1994, the Town of Kyabram was abolished, and along with the City of Echuca, the Shires of Deakin, Rochester and Waranga, and a number of neighbouring districts, was merged into the newly created Shire of Campaspe.

Wards
The Town of Kyabram was not divided into wards, and its nine councillors represented the entire town.

Population

* Estimate in the 1958 Victorian Year Book.

References

External links
 Victorian Places - Kyabram

Kyabram